Altab Ali (24 Oct 1953– 4 May 1978) was a Bangladeshi textile worker stabbed to death in London, in a racially motivated killing. His death sparked widespread outrage and grassroots action that helped to reduce racism against British Bangladeshis and British Asians in the United Kingdom.

Early life
Altab Ali flew from East Pakistan to London Heathrow Airport on transit to Mosley in Birmingham on the 23rd of August 1968 with his uncle, Abdul Hashim. In 1975 he returned to Bangladesh to be married. At the time of his death he was 25 and worked as a textile worker in an area off Brick Lane.

Background

The East End of London had decades of racial tensions. In 1936 Oswald Mosley had planned a march against the then area's Jewish population. At the time the British Union of Fascists was stopped by more than 300,000 protestors - an event known as the Battle of Cable Street. Since this time there had been many racist incidents against the area's Asian community, and on the day of the murder the National Front had candidates standing in local elections.

Death
On 4 May 1978, a day when local elections were being held, Altab Ali was stabbed in Adler Street, adjacent to the open space then known as St Mary's Park. He was attacked by three teenagers: Roy Arnold and Carl Ludlow were both 17 years old, the third boy was 16 years old and was named by his surname in March 2020 as part of the Freedom of Information . He was dead on arrival at the Royal London Hospital. The BBC reported the murder as racially motivated and random.

Legacy

Altab Ali's death sparked protests within the area. The ethnic minorities of the area (“Bangladeshi people, Caribbean people, Indian people, Pakistani people”) collaborated to call for change. 10 days after the death a group of protestors marched across central London campaigning for an end to racism. They took the coffin of Altab Ali to Downing Street.

In 1989 a memorial was built at the scene of Altab Ali's murder, and in 1998 the park was renamed to Altab Ali Park. In 2015 it was announced that the borough of Tower Hamlets would host an annual Altab Ali Commemoration Day.

References

External links
 Altab Ali Foundation
 Television report by Thames Television
 Freedom of Information

1953 births
1978 deaths
Bangladeshi emigrants to England
People from Sylhet District
Racially motivated violence in England
20th-century Bengalis